Thushari Jayasekera is a Sri Lankan-American actress, performer, and writer.

Biography 
Thushari is an American actress of South Asian origin. As a child, she moved with her parents to the United States.  She was born in Sri Lanka and raised in the US state of California. (In a broader sense of ethnicity she belongs to the South Asian-East Indian Americans category with an American attitude with traditional cultural style.)Thushari was always drawn to performing and writing. She wrote skits and monologues for herself and friends to perform. She wrote and still writes poetry and questions serious situations in the world and writes little solutions. She has acted in independent films such as the Yal Devi, Man Without A Head, and in American & Sri Lankan-American Stage productions including a role as one of the female leads in the dramas Parasthawa & Doopatha presented by the Drama Circle of California(SLADCC).

She has created several independent projects for public broadcast like the Original Recipe which is a variety show with skits, interviews, and music as well as Jelly Noose. Now Jelly Noose is a blog that delivers non-urgent news around town with a Sri Lankan American flavour. She launched a mini-zine titled Apsara which highlights information in the South Asian Community. Currently, she writes and performs original performance arts pieces using words, dance and movement. A well known piece is where she uses actual rain as a metaphor She, also, writes poetry and short stories. She is an announcer/emcee at festivals and events in Southern California and brings her personal style to hosting a show. She is best known for her good acting work, volunteering, community outreach work and outspokenness.

Her breakthrough role in prime-time television is that of Pinky on NBC Universal network's sitcom Outsourced 2010–2011. She is a Hollywood entertainment product.

Activities 
She volunteered with Rain Bird Corporation to decorate their Rose Parade floats. In 2003, her suggestion "Water Wonderland" was picked for the title of that year's award winning float. In November 2006, she visited Sri Lanka for the first time after living in the USA, and felt love for the land and the people. She was invited to entertain at a local "Housewives Association's Annual Christmas Event" where they help others come up in society. "Even though I was not a Mrs. yet, I was invited to be Mrs. Clause and announce/emcee at the event. I was recommended by a lady who has seen me act in a play in the U.S., I was really excited and it was so cool. Also, interacting with people who live life in Lanka helped me understand their condition a little better, I talked to anyone who would talk to me from the 3 wheeler drivers, security guards, students, soldiers on leave, store clerks, and the potential of the country is tremendous, only if they choose to exercise that potential..." Also, through a friend of the family, she was invited to participate in a segment of the Iraj Show. She participates in rallies to create awareness for fair labor practices for unions.

Highlights 
Featured in the Shine on Hollywood Magazine May 2013
Invited and named an ambassador for Rainforest Rescue's Lanka Conservation programs April 2013

Film and television 

 Moonbound24,  2016 Doughboy Films, (BabyLoon)
 Don't Trust the B---- in Apartment 23, 2011 ABC, FOX (executive assistant)
 The Original Recipe 2006 (creator)

Audiobooks
 Love Marriage: A Novel 2012, Audible Inc.

Stage plays 
 2009 Ramayana-adapted for the kids
 2008-Sketch Comedy
 2007-Doopatha
 2006-Dolige Sihinaya,
 Stye of the Eye(Durang Durang) with the Actor's Collective at the Underground Theater,
 Duty First
 2005-Parasthawa, Muwan Pellessa (stage drama in Los Angeles)

Presenter and cast of
Golden Raspberry Awards 2016 -her presentation of worst supporting actor category & special Barry L. Bumstead Award is online on YT
 Golden Raspberry Awards 2015 (news page not available for the article)
 Golden Raspberry Awards 2014
 Golden Raspberry Awards 2013
 Golden Raspberry Awards 2012 -held April 1, 2012 (Razzies 2013-2016 held on the day prior to the Oscars)

Web series/webisodes 
 Moonbound 24
 Hollywood Wasteland
 Double Cross

Performance art, sketch, animation, dance and movement
She creates her own performance arts pieces and creates experimental mini story
projects online. 
 Girl on the Sidewalk
 Laila Light
 Buzz Killers
 The Biachchi Show 
 Jelly Jam
 Kundumani-Dance & Movement
 Tears in the Rain
 Talk It Out

References 

Sri Lankan film actresses
Sinhalese writers
Living people
Sri Lankan emigrants to the United States
1984 births
Sinhalese actresses
Sri Lankan television actresses